A real defense is a justification for a maker or drawer not to honor a negotiable instrument even if it has been transferred to a holder in due course (or "HDC") because it makes the instrument “void” according to Uniform Commercial Code §3-305 comment 1, thus the defense can't be "cut off" by the transfer to an HDC.  Contrast this with personal defenses (such as failure of consideration), which cannot protect the maker against the claims by an HDC.

Ten types of real defenses depending upon state law
1. Fraud inducing obligor to sign instrument without a reasonable opportunity to learn of its fraudulent character or essential terms (also known as “(fraud in the factum”); this depends upon consideration of “all relevant factors”;

2. forgery of a necessary signature;

3. adjudicated insanity which renders the instrument void;

4. material alteration of the instrument, such as the amount;

5. infancy which renders the instrument voidable or void;

6. illegality which renders the instrument void;

7. duress at the time of making the instrument;

8. discharge of obligor in insolvency proceedings, or any discharge known to the HDC;

9. a suretyship defense, such as the holder knew an indorser was signing as a surety or accommodation party;

10. statute of limitation (generally 3 years after dishonor of a draft or 6 years after demand or other due date on a note).

Legal defenses
Negotiable instrument law